Broomtown may refer to:

Broomtown, Alabama
Broomtown, Georgia